Bellevue 600 is a future high-rise office building developed by Amazon in Bellevue, Washington, United States. It began construction in 2021 and is scheduled to be completed in 2024. The 43-story,  building would join 555 Tower as the tallest building in Bellevue. The project is located in Downtown Bellevue at the intersection of Northeast 6th Street and 110th Avenue Northeast, adjacent to the Bellevue Transit Center and a future Link light rail station. A second phase would construct a 27-story tower to the west, replacing an existing office building.

History

Bellevue 600 is planned to be located on a block bound to the south by Northeast 6th Street, to the west by 108th Avenue Northeast, and to the east by 110th Avenue Northeast. The Bellevue Corporate Center, a 10-story office building on the southwest corner of the block, was built in 1980 to serve as the regional office of Honeywell. A three-story parking garage with 650 stalls was built on the southeast corner of the block and was later joined by a customer service center for the Bellevue Transit Center that opened in 2006. The north half of the block is occupied by a church and a surface parking lot, both of which were sold in 2014 and 2015 to a developer planning a three-tower residential complex.

In February 2016, Seattle developer Touchstone and Chicago developer Equity Group Investments applied for permits to build a 34-story office building and 41-story hotel with 500 rooms on the south half of the block, which would retain the Bellevue Corporate Center. The master development plan for the project, named "Bellevue 600", was approved by the city government in April 2017 with minor conditions, but Touchstone and Equity did not plan to begin construction. The approved design included a shared podium between the two towers, an underground parking garage with 1,960 stalls, and a pedestrian bridge connecting to a future development on the north side of the block.

Equity Commonwealth, a sister company to Equity Group, retained ownership of the Bellevue Corporate Center and the full  property and renovated the building in 2016. The property and project rights were sold to Amazon in April 2019 for $194.9 million through a shell corporation named Acorn Development. Amazon announced that it plans to begin construction in 2021 and open the building by 2024 as part of a major expansion into Bellevue with 15,000 total employees in the city. The Bellevue city government granted planning approval for the first phase of the Bellevue 600 project in January 2021. Construction began in March 2021 with demolition of the parking garage on the site.

Design

The 43-story,  tower would be the tallest building in Bellevue and the tallest to be built by Amazon, surpassing its Seattle campus. The complex would have an underground parking garage with 1,175 stalls that would be shared with a potential 33-story,  tower on the southwest corner of the block. A four-story,  meeting center and public plaza would be located at the southeast corner of the block, facing the Bellevue Downtown light rail station. It is designed by Seattle-based NBBJ and is planned to be built by Sellen Construction, working with various contractors and consultants; both companies previously worked with Amazon on their Seattle campus.

A second tower on the southwest corner of the block, replacing the Bellevue Corporate Center, is also planned as part of the Bellevue 600 project. The second tower will have  of office space,  of retail and exhibition space on the ground floor, and a childcare center. Its underground parking garage—connected to the first building's garage—will have six levels with 718 stalls for cars and 1,000 stalls for bicycles. The second tower is planned to begin construction in 2022 and be completed by 2025.

References

Further reading

Amazon (company) facilities
NBBJ buildings
Proposed skyscrapers in the United States
Skyscraper office buildings in Washington (state)
Skyscrapers in Bellevue, Washington